Dhupguri Assembly constituency is an assembly constituency in Jalpaiguri district in the Indian state of West Bengal. It is reserved for scheduled castes.

Overview
As per orders of the Delimitation Commission, No. 15 Dhupguri Assembly constituency (SC) covers Dhupguri municipality, Banarhat I, Barogharia, Gadhearkuthi, Gadong-I, Gadong II, Jharaltagram I, Jharaltagram II, Magurmari I, Magurmari II, Sakoyajhora II, Salbari I, Salbari II gram panchayats of Dhupguri community development block,

Dhupguri Assembly constituency is part of No. 3 Jalpaiguri (Lok Sabha constituency) (SC).

Members of Legislative Assembly

Election results

2021 Election

2016 Election

2011
In the 2011 election, Mamata Ray of CPI(M) defeated her nearest rival Mina Barman of Trinamool Congress.

.# Swing calculated on Congress+Trinamool Congress vote percentages taken together in 2006.

1977–2006
In 2006 and 2001 state assembly elections, Lakshmi Kanta Roy of CPI(M) won the 15 Dhupguri (SC) seat defeating his nearest rival Ashok Kumar Barman of Trinamool Congress. Contests in most years were multi cornered but only winners and runners are being mentioned. Banamali Roy of CPI(M) defeated Nripendra Nath Roy of Congress in 1996, Birendra Nath Barman of Congress in 1991, Nripendra Nath Roy of Congress in 1987, and Jagadamba Roy of Congress in 1982 and 1977.

1951–1972
Bhawani Paul of Congress won in 1972 and 1971. Anil Guha Neogi of SSP won in 1969 and 1967. Dhupguri constituency did not exist 1962 and 1957. In independent India's first election in 1951 Rabindra Nath Sikdar of Congress won from Dhupguri.

References

Assembly constituencies of West Bengal
Politics of Jalpaiguri district